Thompsoniella is a genus of blow fly in the family Mesembrinellidae.

Species
T. andina Wolff et al., 2014
T. anomala Guimarães, 1977

References

Mesembrinellidae
Diptera of South America